Cupuliferoidaepollenites was a genus of early Cretaceous (late Albian) angiosperm with many different species with distribution .  Paleo-botanical evidence shows a migration pattern of its ancestors beginning in paleotropical regions of East Asia and its migration through Indonesia and some ancestors settling in Australia.

References

Prehistoric angiosperm genera
Cretaceous plants